Peter R. Jennings (born 1950) is a Canadian physicist, scientist, inventor, software developer, computer chess programmer, and entrepreneur. He is best known for creating MicroChess, the first microcomputer game to be sold commercially in 1976.

Biography

Early life 
Jennings was born in Bedford, England, in 1950. In the 1960s his family moved to Ontario, Canada.
He received an MA in physics from SUNY Stony Brook University in 1972, and an MBA in finance and marketing from McMaster University in 1974.

Microchess 
Jennings developed Microchess shortly after leaving graduate school in New York; the code was sold on paper, so buyers had to manually enter the program using a keyboard. Microchess was the first software to sell over 10,000 copies.

Later versions, on the Apple II and the TRS-80, sold millions of copies. It was also available on the Commodore PET and Atari 400/800 platforms.

ChessMate 
Jennings also developed the first model of the ChessMate, working for Commodore in 1977.

Later years 
In 1976, along with Dan Fylstra, he co-founded the corporation Personal Software, which became VisiCorp, and was involved in the creation of VisiCalc, the first spreadsheet program. MicroChess sales helped to finance the development of VisiCalc.

Publications 
 January 1978: "The Second World Computer Chess Championships". BYTE. p. 108.
 March 1978: "Microchess 1.5 vs. Dark Horse". BYTE. p. 166.
 1979: "Revolution in Personal Computing". Wharton Magazine.
 No date: "A Good, Long Read (for 18 Years)". Foundation RISC User Online. RISCOS Ltd.

References 

Canadian businesspeople
Canadian inventors
Canadian physicists
Computer chess people
Living people
1950 births